is a Japanese gymnast. She competed for the national team at the 2008 and 2012 Summer Olympics in the Women's artistic team all-around.

References

Japanese female artistic gymnasts
1991 births
Living people
Olympic gymnasts of Japan
Gymnasts at the 2008 Summer Olympics
Gymnasts at the 2012 Summer Olympics
Asian Games medalists in gymnastics
Gymnasts at the 2010 Asian Games
Asian Games silver medalists for Japan
Medalists at the 2010 Asian Games
21st-century Japanese women